NGC 306 is an open cluster in the Small Magellanic Cloud. It is located in the constellation Tucana. It was discovered on October 4, 1836 by John Herschel.

References

0306
18361004
Tucana (constellation)
Small Magellanic Cloud
Open clusters